Kiwai Island is the largest island in the Fly River delta, Papua New Guinea. It is one of the Torres Strait Islands. It is 59 km long along the northwest–southeast axis from Wamimuba Point in the northwest to the village of Saguane (Sanguane) in the south, and up to 9 km wide, with an average width of 5.6 km. Its area is 359 km2. Neighboring Purutu and Wabuda Islands to the north and northeast are also among the three largest islands in the Fly River delta. A language study mentioned a population of about 4500, but the census of population of 2000 showed only 2092 inhabitants.

The island separates the north and south entrances of the Fly River. It is well wooded and only a few feet above water. The chief village, Iasa, is located on the south side of the island. Sumai village is on the same side of the island and 24 km farther northwest. Doropo village is about midway along the north side of the island. At the east end of the island are other small villages, such as Sagasia, Ipisia, Agobara and Oromosapuo.

The inhabitants of the Fly River delta engage in agriculture and hunting. Coconut palm, breadfruit, plantain, sago palm, and sugar cane are grown.

Administratively, the island is part of Kiwai Rural LLG (Local Level Government area) of South Fly District, Western Province.

See also
Kiwai language
Kiwaian languages
Kiwai Rural LLG

References

Fly River
Islands of Papua New Guinea
Western Province (Papua New Guinea)